Dwight Barnett (born 1 March 1982 in St. Andrew) is a Jamaican footballer who currently plays for the Tampa Marauders of the National Premier Soccer League.

Career

Youth and College
Barnett played two years of college soccer at Herkimer County Community College, captaining the Generals to a 2005 NJCAA Division III National Championship. He scored 53 goals and had 34 assists in his two years at the college, and he helped lead the Generals to two Region III Championships, a National 2nd-place finish in 2004 and a National Championship in 2005. He was named Mountain Valley Conference and Region III Player of the Year in both 2004 and 2005, and NJCAA National Player of the Year in 2005.

He transferred to Lynn University in his junior year, and led his team in points, foals and assists in both his years at the school. He was named Offensive Player of the Year in 2007, was a two-time First and Second team All Sunshine State Conference, an All Regional Team selection in 2006 and 2007, and three Time NSCAA All American.

During his college years Barnett also played in the USL Premier Development League for the Westchester Flames and the Cape Cod Crusaders.

Professional
Barnett was drafted in the third round (38th overall) of the 2008 MLS SuperDraft by Chicago Fire, and played 5 games in preseason, but was not offered a professional contract by the team. He subsequently signed with Montreal Impact in the USL First Division, and made his professional debut as a substitute against Miami FC, scoring the game winner and his first professional goal in a 2–1 victory. He made his first career start against Toronto FC in a Canadian CONCACAF Champions League qualifier, and went on to make six more appearances for Impact before being released at the end of the year.

After a successful trial he was offered a contracted with Irish side Dundalk, and was given the squad number 15.

References

1982 births
Living people
Jamaican footballers
Jamaican expatriate footballers
Expatriate association footballers in the Republic of Ireland
Westchester Flames players
Cape Cod Crusaders players
Montreal Impact (1992–2011) players
Dundalk F.C. players
VSI Tampa Bay FC (PDL) players
USL League Two players
USL First Division players
Lynn Fighting Knights men's soccer players
Chicago Fire FC draft picks
Tampa Marauders players
Association football forwards
Tampa Bay Rowdies players
People from Saint Andrew Parish, Jamaica